Live at Earls Court is a live album by Morrissey. Its sleeve notes state that it was "recorded live at Earls Court in London on 18 December 2004 in front of 17,183 people."

Track listing
All tracks written by Morrissey and Alain Whyte except as noted.

"How Soon Is Now?" (Morrissey, Johnny Marr)
"First of the Gang to Die"
"November Spawned a Monster" (Morrissey, Clive Langer)
"Don't Make Fun of Daddy's Voice"
"Bigmouth Strikes Again" (Morrissey, Marr)
"I Like You" (Morrissey, Boz Boorer)
"Redondo Beach" (Patti Smith, Lenny Kaye, Richard Sohl)
"Let Me Kiss You"
"Subway Train – Munich Air Disaster 1958" medley (David Johansen, Johnny Thunders – Morrissey, Whyte)
"There Is a Light That Never Goes Out" (Morrissey, Marr)
"The More You Ignore Me, the Closer I Get" (Morrissey, Boorer)
"Friday Mourning"
"I Have Forgiven Jesus"
"The World Is Full of Crashing Bores" (Morrissey, Boorer)
"Shoplifters of the World Unite" (Morrissey, Marr)
"Irish Blood, English Heart"
"You Know I Couldn't Last" (Morrissey, Whyte, Gary Day)
"Last Night I Dreamt That Somebody Loved Me" (Morrissey, Marr)

Singles
One single was released from the album:

"Redondo Beach"/"There Is a Light That Never Goes Out" double A-side
B-sides: "Noise Is the Best Revenge", "It's Hard to Walk Tall When You're Small" (BBC Session)

It was released on 28 March 2005 in Europe and on 5 April in the United States. In the United Kingdom, the single reached number 11 in the Top 40. In Europe the single preceded the album, whereas in the United States the roles were reversed.

Personnel
 Morrissey – vocals
 Boz Boorer – guitar, congas, clarinet, backing vocals
 Jesse Tobias – guitar
 Michael Farrell – keyboards, percussion, trumpet, backing vocals
 Gary Day – bass
 Dean Butterworth – drums

Morrissey albums
Albums produced by Peter Asher
2005 live albums
Sanctuary Records live albums